Cinachyrella is a genus of marine sponges in the family Tetillidae.

Species
The following species are recognised in the genus Cinachyrella:
 Cinachyrella albabidens Lendenfeld, 1907
 Cinachyrella albaobtusa Lendenfeld, 1907
 Cinachyrella albatridens Lendenfeld, 1907
 Cinachyrella alloclada Uliczka, 1929
 Cinachyrella anatriaenilla Fernandez, Kelly & Bell, 2017
 Cinachyrella anomala Dendy, 1905
 Cinachyrella apion Uliczka, 1929
 Cinachyrella arabica Carter, 1869
 Cinachyrella arenosa van Soest & Stentoft, 1988
 Cinachyrella australiensis Carter, 1886
 Cinachyrella australis Lendenfeld, 1888
 Cinachyrella cavernosa Lamarck, 1815
 Cinachyrella cavernosa sensu Burton, 1959
 Cinachyrella clavaeformis Fernandez, Rodriguez, Santos, Pinheiro & Muricy, 2018
 Cinachyrella clavigera Hentschel, 1912
 Cinachyrella crustata Wilson, 1925
 Cinachyrella desqueyrouxae Van Soest & Hooper, 2020
 Cinachyrella enigmatica Burton, 1934
 Cinachyrella eurystoma Keller, 1891
 Cinachyrella globulosa Gray, 1873
 Cinachyrella hamata Lendenfeld, 1907
 Cinachyrella hirsuta Dendy, 1889
 Cinachyrella ibis Row, 1911
 Cinachyrella kuekenthali Uliczka, 1929
 Cinachyrella lacerata Bösraug, 1913
 Cinachyrella levantinensis Vacelet, Bitar, Carteron, Zibrowius & Perez, 2007
 Cinachyrella macellata Sollas, 1886
 Cinachyrella malaccensis (Sollas, 1902)
 Cinachyrella mertoni Hentschel, 1912
 Cinachyrella minuta Wilson, 1902
 Cinachyrella novaezealandiae Brøndsted, 1924
 Cinachyrella nuda Hentschel, 1912
 Cinachyrella paterifera Wilson, 1925
 Cinachyrella phacoides Hentschel, 1911
 Cinachyrella porosa (Lendenfeld, 1888)
 Cinachyrella robusta Carter, 1887
 Cinachyrella schulzei Keller, 1891
 Cinachyrella strongylophora Fernandez, Rodriguez, Santos, Pinheiro & Muricy, 2018
 Cinachyrella tarentina Pulitzer-Finali, 1983
 Cinachyrella tenuiviolacea Pulitzer-Finali, 1982
 Cinachyrella trochiformis Keller, 1891
 Cinachyrella unjinensis Shim & Sim, 2010
 Cinachyrella uteoides Dendy, 1924
 Cinachyrella vaccinata Dendy, 1922

References

Spirophorida